The Costa Rica women's national handball team is the national team of Costa Rica. It is governed by the Federacion Costaricense de Balonmano and takes part in international handball competitions.

Results

Pan American Championship

Central American and Caribbean Games

Central American Games

Central American Championship

External links

IHF profile

Women's national handball teams
Handball
Women's handball in Costa Rica